Pseudoschrankia brevipalpis is a species of moth in the genus Pseudoschrankia, endemic to Oahu in the Hawaiian Islands. It is a pollinator of Schiedea kaalae.

References

Endemic moths of Hawaii
Hypeninae
Moths described in 2015